Douglas September, (born September 25, 1972, in Cape Breton, Nova Scotia) is a Canadian musician. He is known for his poetic lyrics, as well as his innovative musical style that blends folk and blues with a caustic modern commentary. As a composer, musician, producer and engineer, September's passion for arranging music from the ordinary every day into a unique auditory experience has evolved into a singular style. His music has been likened to Bob Dylan, Tim Buckley, and Tom Waits.

Career
September has collaborated with many talented musicians, such as Michael Shrieve (1998 release, Producer-Ten Bulls; Gold Circle/Samson Music), Bill Frisell (1998 release, Lead Guitar-Ten Bulls; Gold Circle/Samson Music), David Torn (2001 release, Producer-Oil Tan Bow; Lupins), Robby Aceto (2001 release, Oil Tan Bow; Lupins and 1999 release, IO; Gold Circle/Samson Music), Rich DePaolo; (1999 release, IO;Gold Circle/Samson Music), Wayne Horvitz (1998 release, Ten Bulls; Gold Circle/Samson Music), David Bearwald and Steve Lindsey (The Runner, 2000).

He has four albums as a solo performer with two where he is involved in co-production, and composing music for The Runner and was signed previously with what is now known as Gold Circle Films for albums Ten Bulls and Io. He has also been producer/engineer for other artists such as Halifax songwriter Matthew Grimson, guitarist Tom Fidgen, B3 Hammond organist John T. Davis, and scored a soundtrack for the short film Malcontents.

In January 2005, UK Uncut, listed Douglas September's song "Lady and I" from album 10 Bulls as their #1 Track influenced by Bob Dylan.

Originally from Cape Breton Island, off the east coast of Canada, Douglas currently lives in Toronto, Ontario, Canada, with his wife and daughter.

Discography

 (1996) Crows; LupinsProduced by Vaughn PassmoreRecorded at Invisible Sound, Toronto, ON
 (1998) Ten Bulls; Gold Circle/Samson MusicProduced by Michael ShrieveMusicians: Douglas September, Bill Frisell (Guitar), Wayne Horvitz (Keyboards), Michael Rhodes (Bass), Michael Shrieve (Drums & Percussion), Loops & Textures (David Torn)
 (1999) IO; Gold Circle/Samson Music; Produced by Douglas September, Robby Aceto, Rich DePaolo, Bill King, et al. Musicians: Douglas September, Robby Aceto (Guitars, Ambient loops, Harmonium, Vibes, Alto Mandolin, Accordion), Bill King (Drums), Rich DePaolo (Bass), et al.
 (2001) Oil Tan Bow; Lupins; Produced By: SPLaTTeRCell (David Torn) and Robby Aceto with additional production by Douglas September. Musicians: Douglas September, Robby Aceto (Guitars, Loops, Accordion), SPLaTTeRCell (David Torn) (Additional Freq Programming & Rhythm Arrangements).
 (2009) Sundays in Radio

Soundtracks and short film
 (1999) The Runner, directed by Ron Moler, compositions for scene and closing credits (The Search, The Light)
 (2004) Malcontents, directed by Maurey Loeffler, scoring and composition for short film.
 (2006–2008) Douglas September Videos on YouTube
 (2008) Sundays in Television, Podcast

References

External links
 www.douglasseptember.com
 https://web.archive.org/web/20100713032351/http://radio3.cbc.ca/#/bands/Douglas-September 

Canadian rock guitarists
Canadian male guitarists
Canadian songwriters
Canadian electronic musicians
Canadian folk musicians
1972 births
Living people
Canadian alternative rock musicians
Alternative rock guitarists
People from the Cape Breton Regional Municipality
21st-century Canadian guitarists
21st-century Canadian male musicians